Beginning with the Chicano Movement of the 1960s, Chicanas used art to express political and social resistance. Through different art mediums both past and contemporary, Chicana artists have continued to explore and interrogate traditional Mexican-American values and embody feminist themes through different mediums including murals, painting, photography, and more. The momentum created from the Chicano Movement spurred a Chicano Renaissance among Chicanas and Chicanos.  Political art was created by poets, writers, playwrights, and artists and used to defend against their oppression and societal marginalization. During the 1970s, Chicana feminist artists differed from their Anglo-feminist counterparts in the way they collaborated.  Chicana feminist artists often utilized artistic collaborations and collectives that included men, while Anglo-feminist artists generally utilized women-only participants.

The Woman's Building (1973–1991) 
The Woman's Building opened in Los Angeles, CA in 1973.  In addition to housing women-owned businesses, the center held multiple art galleries and studio spaces.  Women of color, including Chicanas, historically experienced racism and discrimination within the building from white feminists.  Not many Chicana artists were allowed to participate in the Woman's Building's exhibitions or shows.  Chicana artists Olivia Sanchez and Rosalyn Mesquite were among the few included.  Additionally, the group Las Chicanas exhibited Venas de la Mujer in 1976.

Social Public Art Resource Center (SPARC)
In 1976, co-founders Judy Baca (the only Chicana), Christina Schlesinger, and Donna Deitch established the Social and Public Art Resource Center (SPARC). It consisted of studio and workshop spaces for artists.  SPARC functioned as an art gallery and also kept records of murals. SPARC was created to support youth in areas where gangs are prevalent, which is why community youth was involved in the making of The Great Wall of Los Angeles. SPARC is still active and encourages a space for Chicana community collaboration in cultural and artistic campaigns.

Los Four
Muralist Judithe Hernández joined the all-male art collective in 1974 as its fifth member.  The group already included Frank Romero, Beto de la Rocha, Gilbert Luján, and Carlos Almaráz. This was crucial at the time as they were trying to be inclusive and steer away gender roles they grew up knowing. The collective was active in the 1970s through early 1980s.

Street art

Murals

Murals were the preferred medium of street art used by Chicana artists during the Chicano Movement. Murals became largely popular during  in the 1970s as they were intended to bring people together. Judy Baca was the first Chicana to create a mural, "Mi Abuelita", she led the large-scale project for SPARC, The Great Wall of Los Angeles.  It took five summers to complete the 700 meter long mural. The mural was completed by Baca, Judithe Hernández, Olga Muñiz, Isabel Castro, Yreina Cervántez, and Patssi Valdez in addition to over 400 more artists and community youth.  During the creation of The Great Wall of Los Angeles Baca started putting women in leadership roles and trying to get them to become involved in the making of the mural.  Located in Tujunga Flood Control Channel in the Valley Glen area of the San Fernando Valley, the mural depicts California’s erased history of marginalized people of color and minorities.

In 1989, Yreina Cervántez along with assistants Claudia Escobedes, Erick Montenegro, Vladimir Morales, and Sonia Ramos began the mural La Ofrenda, located in downtown Los Angeles. The mural, a tribute to Latina and Latino farm workers, features Dolores Huerta at the center with two women arched the history of Los Angeles and met with historians as she originally planned out the mural. The mural was halted after Carrasco refused alterations demanded from City Hall due to her depictions of formerly enslaved entrepreneur and philanthropist Biddy Mason, the internment of Japanese American citizens during World War II, and the 1943 Zoot Suit Riots.

Performance Art
Chicana entertainers have utilized the deconstructive qualities of performance art to challenge thought of character, identity, embodiment, and culture. Starting in the 1970s, Chicana artists began experimenting with street based performances that highlighted their unique role as cultural outsiders to white middle-class norms. Patssi Valdez was a member of the performance group Asco from the early 1970s to the mid-1980s. Asco's art spoke about the problems that arise from Chican@s unique experience residing at the intersection of racial, gender, and sexual oppression.

La Panza Monologues 
The Panza Monologues is a performance art piece built around the narratives of Chicana women. The Panza Monologues were composed by Virginia Grise and Irma Mayorga and presented as a solo performance by Grise herself. The piece was intended to spotlight something that most times women are made to feel like should be hidden, making it seem shameful, and as a reminder that body images can greatly influence a woman's life.

Xandra Ibarra is Chicana performance artist who coined the term  as a way to describe her performances of Mexican iconography that reveal the ways they function as racist tropes within performance cultures.

Photography 
Laura Aguilar, known for her "compassionate photography," which often involved using herself as the subject of her work but also individuals who lacked representation in the mainstream: Chicanas, the LBGTQ community, and women of different body types.  During the 1990s, Aguilar photographed the patrons of an Eastside Los Angeles lesbian bar. Aguilar utilized her body in the desert as the subject of her photographs wherein she manipulated it to look sculpted from the landscape. In 1990, Aguilar created Three Eagles Flying, a three-panel photograph featuring herself half nude in the center panel with the flag of Mexico and the United States of opposite sides as her body is tied up by the rope and her face covered. The triptych represents the imprisonment felt by the two cultures she belongs to.  Laura Aguilar created a collection of work that accepts the human figure as its focal request. The best of her art is from her initial work, known as the Latina Lesbian Series, which started in 1987. The series comprises highly contrasting pictures of ladies who identified as Latina and lesbian. Photographs in this series frequently went with the woman's signature as well.

Delilah Montoya was likewise a powerful Chicana photographic artist. Montoya's assortment of work explores the amendment of female generalizations and symbols and utilizes visual and text-based accounts or narration of a hidden subject. In 2003 Montoya and Orlando Lara went across the Mexico-American border and took pictures of passageways used by immigrants crossing the border from Mexico into America.

Modern work 
Though the Chicano movement has passed, Chicanas continue to use art as a way to uplift their perspectives and celebrate Chicana voices. Young Chicana artists like Diana Yesenia Alvarado, who works with sculpture, create art that represent their culture and get little recognition.  New art forms have risen as technology has begun to play a more vital role in daily life as artists like Guadalupe Rosales use platforms like Instagram as a part of their work. Rosales uses her role as an artist and an archivist to artfully collect photos and magazines of Chicanas from the 1990s. She portrayed her own understanding of growing up Chicana in East Los Angeles, a predominantly Latino area. On her account Veteranas y Rucas, her photos depict men in baggy pants and women with teased hair making their way through a time of anti-immigrant sentiments and gang violence. What started as a way for Rosales' family to connect over their shared culture through posting images of Chican@s history and nostalgia soon grew to an archive dedicated to not only 1990s Chican@ youth culture but also as far back as the 1940s. Additionally, Rosales has created art installations to display the archive away from its original digital format and exhibited solo shows Echoes of a Collective Memory and Legends Never Die, A Collective Memory. Rosales is the recipient of a 2019 Gordon Parks Foundation Fellowship. She was the Los Angeles County Museum of Art’s first Instagram artist in residence in 2017. Others like poet Felicia "Fe" Montes have gained popularity for their work in Chicana art for still other forms. Montes uses spoken word and slam traditions among other mediums to relate with her Latina following about identity. She reads her poetry in unconventional places and questions women’s historically subservient and lower-serving roles than men. As she writes, she keeps the Chicano culture in Los Angeles in mind, through women's collectives like Mujeres de Maiz.

Themes

La Virgen

Over the years, la Virgen de Guadalupe has been used by Chicana artists to explore themes of repression and feminine strength. She has become a symbol through which artists have attempted to eradicate the stigmas facing women’s place in society and ownership of their bodies. Alma López, Margarita "Mita" Cuaron, Yolanda López and Ester Hernandez are four Chicana feminist artists who used reinterpretations of La Virgen de Guadalupe to empower Chicanas. La Virgen as a symbol of the challenges Chicanas face as a result of the unique oppression they experience religiously, culturally, and through their gender.

 Alma López focuses on eradicating the stigmas surrounding women. She painted "Our Lady" in 1999, which portrays a modern Virgen de Guadalupe unclothed, supported by an unclothed "angel" with the wings of a monarch. La Virgen wears nothing but flowers, but stands powerfully with her hands at her hips and her face expressing confidence and seriousness. She has reimagined the traditional icon to explore the shamelessness she believes should stem from a woman of today who does not conform to the expectation of society. Especially since La Virgen is typically clothed from head to toe, this piece of art challenges the themes the original pushes forward, including modesty and subservience.  She expresses the need for ownership of the indigenous body. Alma López also painted "Lupe and Sirena in Love" in 1999, which depicts the traditional Virgen de Guadalupe, nicknamed Lupe, lovingly embracing a mermaid. This is Alma López's commentary on Catholic Church teaching regarding sexuality and gender. She portrays a sacred individual romantically embracing another woman, directly challenging commonly followed beliefs that ostracize LGBTQ individuals. Alma López pushes the boundaries that confine the common woman, depicting La Virgen de Guadalupe in modern and controversial light as she paints. "Our Lady of Controversy: Alma Lopez's 'Irreverent Apparition'" (2011) demonstrates some of the angry responses she has received for her work. "Irreverent Apparition" is mixed media and is a sacrilegious depiction of La Virgen.
 Margarita "Mita" Cuaron focuses on light and rebirth when she paints La Virgen de Guadalupe. In her artwork "Virgen de Guadalupe Baby" from 1992, Cuaron toys with the idea of a symbol that never stays static. In her pieces, La Virgen has come to mean the cycle of life. She depicts a baby surrounded by the womb, which is shaped by clouds and La Virgen's typical sunlight and green garments. Within the child's clasped hands is a light red heart. The child is sheltered by the womb, which offers protection from the outside world.
 Like Alma Lopez, Yolanda López also focuses on themes of sexuality and the stigmas of women when she portrays La Virgen de Guadalupe. In her piece, "Love Goddess" from 1978, López merges the image of La Virgen with an image of Sandro Bottecelli's "The Birth of Venus" from the mid 1480s. She makes the commentary that Christian nature rejects the natural appearance of women's bodies by embracing the fact that at an even earlier age, the Greek mythology would embrace it without the shame and fear that has developed. López challenges the virginal image by eradicating the stigma and sin that are often associated; she infuses a sacred religious image with sexuality so as to celebrate it rather than be ashamed.
 Ester Hernández references the sacred Virgen de Guadalupe in her painting, La Ofrenda (1988). It defies the reverence and holiness of La Virgen by being depicted as a tattoo on a lesbian's back. She also painted  (1975).

Collective memory/correcting history
The idea of sharing the erased history of Chicanas has been popular among Chicana artists beginning in the 1970s. Judy Baca and Judithe Hernández have both utilized the theme of correcting history in reference to their mural works. In contemporary art, Guadalupe Rosales uses the theme of collective memory to share Chicana history and nostalgia.

Pre-colonization 
Decolonizing the borderlands has constrained a dismal of assimilation, across the borderlands, artists are recreating and essentially paying tribute to native images and beliefs visioning syncretic symbols that discuss exile, gender grapples, etc.

References

Chicana feminism
Mexican-American culture